Shannon Jerod Shorter (born August 1, 1989) is an American professional basketball player for Split of the Adriatic League and the Croatian League. The 6 ft 4 in (1.93 m) Texan has played for teams in eleven countries including China, Argentina, Japan, Israel, Mexico, Turkey and France.

College career
Shorter played four years of college basketball between 2007 and 2011. After spending his freshman season with Texas A&M–Corpus Christi, Shorter joined Paris Junior College for his sophomore year. He returned to a Division 1 school in 2009, joining North Texas. In 66 games for North Texas over two seasons, he averaged 6.5 points, 3.8 rebounds and 1.9 assists per game.

Professional career
Shorter, who went undrafted in 2011, spent time playing across Mexico, Argentina, Israel, Japan and China between 2012 and 2016.

On September 23, 2016, Shorter signed with TED Ankara Kolejliler of the Turkish Basketball Super League. In March 2017, he left Ankara and joined French team Le Mans Sarthe Basket for the rest of the season.

On May 12, 2017, Shorter signed with Chinese team Hebei Xianglan, returning to the team for a second stint.

On July 28, 2017, Shorter signed with the Adelaide 36ers for the 2017–18 NBL season. 

On March 31, 2018, he signed with Al Riyadi of the Lebanese Basketball League.

On July 30, 2021, he has signed with Afyon Belediye of the Turkish Basketbol Süper Ligi (BSL). Shorther averaged 18.4 points, 5.4 rebounds, and 3.8 assists per game. On December 18, he signed with Split of the Adriatic League and the Croatian League.

References

External links
RealGM profile
Shannon Shorter at lnb.fr

1989 births
Living people
ABA League players
Adelaide 36ers players
Afyonkarahisar Belediyespor players
Al Riyadi Club Beirut basketball players
American expatriate basketball people in Argentina
American expatriate basketball people in Australia
American expatriate basketball people in China
American expatriate basketball people in Croatia
American expatriate basketball people in France
American expatriate basketball people in Israel
American expatriate basketball people in Japan
American expatriate basketball people in Lebanon
American expatriate basketball people in Mexico
American expatriate basketball people in South Korea
American expatriate basketball people in Turkey
American men's basketball players
Basketball players from Houston
Gansos Salvajes UIC players
Hapoel Afula players
Hapoel Kfar Saba B.C. players
Hiroshima Dragonflies players
KK Split players
La Unión basketball players
Le Mans Sarthe Basket players
North Texas Mean Green men's basketball players
Ostioneros de Guaymas (basketball) players
Paris Dragons basketball players
P.A.O.K. BC players
Point guards
Shooting guards
TED Ankara Kolejliler players
Texas A&M–Corpus Christi Islanders men's basketball players
Ulsan Hyundai Mobis Phoebus players